Santin  may refer to:
 Santin (flavonol), a methylated flavonol
 People
 Alessandro Santin (born 1958), an Italian race car driver
 Damían Santín (born 1980), a Uruguayan football player
 César Santin (born 1981), a Brazilian football player
 Guido Santin (1911–2008), an Italian rower who competed in the 1936 Summer Olympics
 Sergio Santín (born 1956), a retired football player from Uruguay
 Places
 Saint-Santin, a commune in the Aveyron department in southern France
 Saint-Santin-Cantalès, a commune in the Cantal department in south-central France
 Saint-Santin-de-Maurs, a commune in the Cantal department in south-central France